The weekly investigations column in the Daily Mirror newspaper edited by Andrew Penman and Nick Sommerlad.

In March 2010 they were awarded the Cudlipp award for campaigning popular journalism at the British Press Awards

The column was previously known as Penman & Greenwood.

References

British investigative journalists